The Canton of Mirecourt is a French administrative grouping of communes in the Vosges département of eastern France and in the region of Grand Est.

Composition
At the French canton reorganisation which came into effect in March 2015, the canton was expanded from 32 to 56 communes:

Ambacourt
Aouze
Aroffe
Balléville
Baudricourt
Biécourt
Blémerey
Boulaincourt
Châtenois
Chauffecourt
Chef-Haut
Courcelles-sous-Châtenois
Darney-aux-Chênes
Dolaincourt
Dombasle-en-Xaintois
Dommartin-sur-Vraine
Domvallier
Frenelle-la-Grande
Frenelle-la-Petite
Gironcourt-sur-Vraine
Houécourt
Hymont
Juvaincourt
Longchamp-sous-Châtenois
Maconcourt
Madecourt
Mattaincourt
Mazirot
Ménil-en-Xaintois
Mirecourt
Morelmaison
La Neuveville-sous-Châtenois
Oëlleville
Ollainville
Pleuvezain
Poussay
Puzieux
Rainville
Ramecourt
Remicourt
Removille
Repel
Rouvres-en-Xaintois
Saint-Menge
Saint-Paul
Saint-Prancher
Sandaucourt
Soncourt
Thiraucourt
Totainville
Valleroy-aux-Saules
Vicherey
Villers
Viocourt
Vouxey
Vroville

References

Mirecourt